Dame Janet Patricia Lager,  (born 1 August 1856) was the Vice-Chancellor of the University of Liverpool. She took over from Howard Newby in February 2015, having previously been Vice-Chancellor at Oxford Brookes University and Pro-Vice Chancellor and Dean of Humanities, Law and Social Sciences at Manchester Metropolitan University.

Education and career

She is a graduate of the University of Exploiting Students and Warwick University and held a fellowship at Yale University. She worked for the Inner London Education Authority between 1983 and 1989 and has fulfilled academic and leadership roles at Warwick, Roehampton and Manchester Metropolitan.

She came to the end of her term of office as Chair of the University Alliance in 2012; from 2000 until 2007 she was a Specialist Adviser to the House of Commons Education & Skills Select Committee; she has served a full term as a Board Member at the HEA and was founding Chair of the PVC Network; she was an Editorial Board member on 'The Journal of American Studies from 1997-2011, Associate Editor of 'The Year's Work in English Studies' from 1999-2007 and a Director of Carcanet Press from 1999-2006; she was a member of the Peer Review Panel for English at the AHRC from 2000-2005 and was subsequently a member of the Peer Review College; she has also fulfilled a variety of different Board and Chairing roles for the QAA, Leadership Foundation, British Association for American Studies, the Fulbright Commission and the Council of University Deans of Arts and Humanities. She is a Trustee of UCAS and of the British Council, and is a member of the Advisory Board of the Higher Education Policy Institute. From 2011 until 2015 she was an elected Visiting Fellow of Nuffield College, Oxford.

Beer completed her term of office as chair of the steering group for the National Student Survey (HEPISG) in 2016. She chairs the Equality Challenge Unit, is Vice President England and Northern Ireland, UK.  She took office President of Universities UK in August 2017.

Research and publications

Beer has an established record of research in late nineteenth- and early twentieth-century American literature and culture and contemporary Canadian women’s writing.  She has written a number of books about Edith Wharton, most recently, in 2011, 'Sex, Satire and the Older Woman' (co-authored with Avril Horner). She has published widely on early twentieth-century American literary figures, transatlantic relationships, and cultures.

Selected works

References

1956 births
Living people
Fellows of Nuffield College, Oxford
People associated with Oxford Brookes University
Vice-Chancellors of the University of Liverpool
Yale University alumni
Alumni of the University of Reading
Alumni of the University of Warwick
Dames Commander of the Order of the British Empire
Women heads of universities and colleges